Asnohuañusja (possibly from Quechua asnu donkey (from Spanish asno), wañuy die, -sqa a suffix  (wañusqa died, dead)) is a  mountain in the western part of the Chila mountain range in the Andes of Peru. It lies in the Arequipa Region, Castilla Province, Chachas District. It is situated southwest of Chila and Choquepirhua, and northwest of Yuraccacsa.

References 

Mountains of Peru
Mountains of Arequipa Region